The men's 800 metres events were held at the 2021 World Para Athletics European Championships in Bydgoszcz, Poland.

Medalists

See also
List of IPC world records in athletics

References

800 metres
2021 in men's athletics
800 metres at the World Para Athletics European Championships